Higgledy House is a British children's television show on the CBeebies channel. The programme originally aired as a segment on Tikkabilla before the episodes were reformatted as a standalone series in 2006.

Synopsis
The series stars Justin Fletcher and Sarah-Jane Honeywell, as two adolescent friends who share a house and whose eccentric exploits are the subject of the show. The BBC described the show as "comedy, learning, and fun for pre school children."

"Higgledy House" was filmed in a house in Fortis Green, London, which provides the main and only setting for each episode. (The only exception is the episode of Camcorder, which was filmed in a different garden in London.) Sarah-Jane and Justin never speak in the episodes, instead using visual movement, grunts, and sound to communicate. Each episode is narrated by usually two children, and they would interact with the characters and explain what is happening.

Standalone format
In 2006, the series' episodes were edited into their own series on CBeebies. This format featured two episodes introduced by a set of children (similar to the style of Teletubbies). The segments were separated by a "Higgle Giggle", a brief scene of children acting out a concept or scene together.

Episode list 
 "Snack" – Justin tries to make himself a cheese sandwich, not realizing that Sarah-Jane is stealing his ingredients.
 "Treasure Hunt" – Justin and Sarah-Jane play a treasure hunt game.
 "Painting" – Sarah-Jane shows off her artistic skills.
 "Cleaning the Car" – Before driving off to go for a picnic, Justin and Sarah-Jane must clean their car.
 "Hide and Seek" – A game of hide and seek borders on the surreal.
 "Cleaning the House" – Spring cleaning ballet style, to the sound of The Nutcracker.
 "Pie" – The pair each make a pie, not realizing they are using the same pie tin to mix their ingredients.
 "Magic Show" – Justin helps Sarah-Jane put on a magic show.
 "Itch" – Justin and Sarah-Jane have a hard time getting rid of some fleas.
 "Holiday" – Justin and Sarah-Jane pack to go on holiday but don't get very far.
 "Sticky" – Justin and Sarah-Jane try to share a bag of toffees, which turns out to be not as easy as it seems.
 "Tent" – Justin and Sarah-Jane have fun in their play tents, but is Sarah-Jane's all it seems?
 "Fitness" – Justin persuades Sarah-Jane to join him with some exercises.
 "Photo" – Realizing that he doesn't have a photograph of Sarah-Jane in his album, Justin decides to show off his photography skills.
 "Euphonium" – A mystery gift proves to be quite puzzling until they work out it's a musical instrument.
 "Decorating" – Justin and Sarah-Jane try to decorate a room but don't do a very good job at it.
 "Meal" – Justin and Sarah-Jane share a meal of soup, spaghetti, and iced buns.
 "Hiccups" – Sarah-Jane tries to find a way to cure Justin's hiccups.
 "Sick" – 'Justin feigns chickenpox in order to get out of doing the washing up.
 "Bedtime" – Justin falls asleep, so Sarah-Jane tries to get him upstairs and ready for bed.
 "Camcorder" – Justin thinks he can help out in Sarah-Jane's film, much to her annoyance.
 "Paddling Pool" – Justin and Sarah-Jane struggle to blow up a paddling pool.
 "Birthday" – Justin throws Sarah-Jane a birthday party, not realizing it isn't her birthday.
 "Movie" – Justin and Sarah-Jane watch a scary movie with popcorn and drinks.
 "Breakfast" – Justin struggles to stay awake and makes a mess of his breakfast.
 "Piano" – Justin and Sarah-Jane both want to play the piano but aren't keen on sharing.
 "Summertime" – Justin and Sarah-Jane both have different ideas for how to spend the summer.
 "Babysitting" – Justin and Sarah-Jane wear themselves out babysitting.
 "Snail Race" – Justin and Sarah-Jane set off for a snail race and picnic.

Standalone version
 "Snack" / "Treasure Hunt"
 "Painting" / "Cleaning the Car"
 "Hide and Seek" / "Cleaning the House" 
 "Pie" / "Magic Show"
 "Itch" / "Holiday"
 "Sticky" / "Tent"
 "Fitness" / "Photo"
 "Euphonium" / "Decorating"
 "Meal" / "Hiccups"
 "Sick" / "Bedtime"
 "Camcorder" / "Paddling Pool"
 "Birthday" / "Movie"
 "Breakfast" / "Piano"
 "Summertime" / "Babysitting"

References

External links
 

2002 British television series debuts
2006 British television series endings
2000s British children's television series
British preschool education television series
BBC children's television shows
CBeebies
English-language television shows
Television series by BBC Studios